Zaur Hashimov (born 25 August 1981) is an Azerbaijani football manager and former player who played as a defender.

Career

Club
Hashimov began his career with the Azerbaijan U-18 team when they participated in the Azerbaijan Top League. Hashimov later went on to represent Shafa Baku, Khazar Universiteti Baku, Inter Baku, Khazar Lankaran, Qarabağ and Sumgayit over his 17-year career.

International
Hashimov made his debut for national team in 1998, making 19 appearances for his country.

Managerial career
On 13 December 2017, Hashimov was appointed as manager of Azerbaijan U18.

National team statistics

Honours
Shafa Baku
Azerbaijan Cup (1): 2000–01
Qarabağ
Azerbaijan Cup (1): 2008–09

References

External links
 

1981 births
Living people
Azerbaijani footballers
Azerbaijani football managers
Azerbaijan international footballers
Qarabağ FK players
People from Sumgait
Association football defenders